Kaddara: Folkelivsbilleder fra Grønland (Sketches from the Folk Life in Greenland) is a 1921 Danish-language opera in four acts by Hakon Børresen to a libretto by C.M. Norman-Hansen (1861-1947).

Recording
Kaddara -  Gitta-Maria Sjöberg, Stig Fogh Andersen, Matti Borg, Elisabeth Hanke, Anette Bod, Maria Hanke, Paul Frederiksen  Ruse Philharmonic Niels Borksand 2CD, CDKlassisk 2013

References

Operas
1921 operas
Danish-language operas